Washington Crossing the Delaware may refer to:

Historical event
 George Washington's crossing of the Delaware River, event during the American Revolutionary War before the Battle of Trenton on December 26, 1776

Art and literature
 Washington Crossing the Delaware (1851 painting), by Emanuel Leutze
 The Passage of the Delaware, 1819 painting by Thomas Sully
 Washington Crossing the Delaware (1953 painting), by Larry Rivers
 "Washington Crossing the Delaware" (sonnet), a 1936 sonnet by David Shulman

See also
 Washington Crossing (disambiguation)